Michael Norman (June 29, 1947 - August 6th, 2021) was an American author known for his supernatural book series Haunted which he has written alongside fellow author Beth Scott. Norman, who hailed from Illinois, graduated with a master's degree from Northern Illinois University in 1969. He worked at the University of Wisconsin–River Falls journalism department from 1973 until his retirement in May 2003. Michael had a guest appearance on the Cartoon Network talk show Space Ghost Coast to Coast on March 8, 1996 in Atlanta, Georgia with Bill Nye the Science Guy in its twenty-fourth episode, Boo!. He later spoke about Haunted Hollywood on the Travel Channel, which was Number 9 on the countdown of World's Creepiest Destinations. This author is survived by his wife Janell and son James.

Bibliography

Haunted series

With Beth Scott
Haunted Wisconsin (1980) 
Haunted Heartland (1985) 
Haunted America (1994)  
Historic Haunted America (1995) 
Haunted Heritage (2002)

Solo
Haunted Homeland (2006)

Plays
Entering the Circle: The Lives of Pioneer Farm Women
Nye and Riley Tonight!

Other
WordWise: Vocabulary Guides to Enhance Your Real-World Conversations (2006) 
Haunted Encounters: Real-life Stories of Supernatural Experiences (2009)

External links

Michael Norman

Writers from Illinois
Writers from Wisconsin
University of Wisconsin–River Falls alumni
People from Macomb, Illinois
Northern Illinois University alumni
University of Wisconsin–River Falls faculty
1947 births
Living people
American male writers